Great Denham is a village and civil parish located in Bedfordshire, England, on the western outskirts of Bedford. The village is the location of Bedford Golf Course.

History
Great Denham is on the banks of River Great Ouse, in a loop carved out by the river flow. It has evidence of Neolithic settlement as well as Roman and Saxon presence in the form of coins, pottery and other implements.

By the 7th century, the Great Denham area had been absorbed into the Saxon kingdom of Mercia. In 886 the Saxons and Vikings fixed a formal boundary between them, along the rivers Thames, Lea and Great Ouse. Great Denham was thus on the  border between the Danelaw and Saxon England, which remained hostile adversaries. England was eventually united as one kingdom. St James Church, just over the border of Great Denham in the neighbouring village of Biddenham, was first constructed in the Norman period.

The Great Denham loop of the river remained undeveloped farmland until the Bedford Golf Course was built in the 1990s, together with a 'golf village', with all roads named after golf courses. It was part of Biddenham parish until April 2007, when the new Parish of Great Denham was created. It covers around 3 km2.

Community facilities
There is a small parade of shops on Anglia Way which includes Sainsbury's Local supermarket, a fish and chip shop, a beauty salon, a charity shop, The Eatery cafe, Taylor Made estate agents, off licence with a post office. There is a GP surgery with ProHealth Clinic located inside it on Kingswood Way, and a Community Hall on Saxon Way. The Ouse Valley Way footpath runs through the village. A new bridge across the Great Ouse opened in 2010 which connects the village with Kempston.  The country park is a fantastic green space providing paths for walking, running, cycling and a number of football pitches available to book for both senior and junior 11-a-side and also a smaller 7-a-side pitch. A sports pavilion provides changing facilities for those using the sports pitches. It is managed by Bedford Borough Council.

Great Denham Primary School opened as part of the development in September 2012.

Great Denham Parish Council was created in April 2007 and has nine members elected every four years. The village is represented on the borough council by Jim Weir.

References

External links

 Great Denham Parish Council
 Great Denham Primary School
 Great Denham Community Hall

Villages in Bedfordshire
Civil parishes in Bedfordshire
Populated places established in the 1990s
Borough of Bedford